This family is a putative ribosomal protein leader autoregulatory structure found in B. subtilis and other low-GC Gram-positive bacteria. It is located in the 5′ untranslated regions of mRNAs encoding ribosomal proteins L10 and L12 (rplJ-rplL). A Rho-independent transcription terminator structure that is probably involved in regulation is included at the 3′ end.

Other ribosomal protein leaders identified in the same study include those of L13, L19, L20 and L21.

References

External links 
 

Ribosomal protein leader